Sieradz Voivodeship was a unit of administrative division and local government in Poland in the years 1975–1998, superseded by Łódź Voivodeship.

A Voivodeship is an area administered by a voivode (Governor), and the Sieradz Voivodeship is the area with the capital city of Sieradz. Sieradz is a significant city of Poland as it is one of the oldest cities of the country, tracing back roughly to the 6th century.

1975-1998
Capital city: Sieradz

Major cities and towns: (population in 1995):
 Zduńska Wola (45,900);
 Sieradz (44,700);
 Wieluń (25,500);
 Łask (20,200).

See also:
 Voivodeships of Poland

1939-1945 
The city of Sieradz was attacked by Germany on September 9, 1939, and was reluctantly home to one of many overpopulated German prisoner-of-war camps. In these camps occurred countless atrocities including torture, slavery/forced labor, starvation, unsafe conditions, beatings, executions, and any more of the common war crimes committed by the German army during WWII.

1772-1795

Sieradz Voivodeship was a unit of administrative division and local government in Poland from 14th century to the partitions of Poland in 1772–1795. It was a part of Greater Poland province.

References

Former voivodeships of Poland (1975–1998)
History of Łódź Voivodeship